Merrill "Bud" Noel born September 10, 1991) is a former American football cornerback.

Early life
A native of Pahokee, Florida, Noel attended Pahokee High School, where he was a teammate of Janoris Jenkins and Richard Ash.

Noel was named ACC Defensive Rookie of the Year in 2011.

Professional career

Buffalo Bills
Following the 2015 NFL Draft, Noel signed with the Buffalo Bills as an undrafted free agent. On September 4, 2015, he was released by the Bills. On September 8, 2015, he was added to the Bills practice squad. He was promoted to the Bills' active roster on December 30.
He was released from the Buffalo bills

References

External links
Buffalo Bills bio
Wake Forest Demon Deacons bio

1991 births
Living people
People from Pahokee, Florida
American football cornerbacks
Wake Forest Demon Deacons football players
Buffalo Bills players